Velasco (also Belasco or Belasko) is a Basque family name. According to the academy of Basque language, it is derived from the Visigothic name 'Vela' (Vigila) and the Basque suffix –sco. The name also made its way into Portuguese language as Vasco. Notable people with the surname include:

The Castilian noble house of Velasco, rulers of the Dukedom of Frías
Alberto Contador Velasco (born 1982), Spanish professional road bicycle racer
Álvaro Velasco (golfer) (born 1981), Spanish professional golfer
Álvaro Velasco (weightlifter) (born 1971), Colombian weightlifter
Ana de Velasco y Girón (1585–1607), mother of John IV of Portugal
Andrés Velasco (born 1961), Chilean economist and former Finance Minister
Camile Velasco (born 1985), Filipino–American singer
Concha Velasco (born 1939), Spanish actress
Cris Velasco (born 1980), American film and video game composer
Diablo Velasco (1919–1999), Mexican trainer of professional wrestlers
Diego López de Zúñiga y Velasco (1510–1564), sixth viceroy of Peru
Domingo Antonio Velasco, 18th–century Italian painter
Eleanor Thornton (1880–1915), (full name Eleanor Velasco Thornton), model for the Rolls–Royce hood ornament, Spirit of Ecstasy
Epimaco Velasco (1935–2014), Filipino politician
Félix Díaz Velasco (1868–1945), Mexican politician and general
Gaspar Borja y Velasco (1580–1645), Spanish Cardinal, metropolitan of Toledo
Iván Velasco, Spanish road bicycle racer
Jaime Castillo Velasco (1914–2003), Chilean politician
José Manso de Velasco, 1st Count of Superunda (1688–1767), Governor of Chile and Viceroy of Peru
José María Velasco Gómez (1840–1912), Mexican painter
José María Velasco Ibarra (1893–1979), Ecuadorian president, five times elected by popular vote.
José María Cervantes y Velasco (c. 1785–1856), Mexican army officer
José Miguel de Velasco (1795–1859), Bolivian president
Jose R. Velasco (1916—2007), Filipino plant physiologist and agricultural chemist
Juan Velasco (1910–1977), Peruvian general, ruler of Peru (1968–1975)
Juan Velasco Damas (born 1977), Spanish footballer
Juan de Velasco (1727–1796), Jesuit priest
Juan Zambudio Velasco (1921–2004), Spanish football goalkeeper
Julio Velasco (born 1952), Argentine volleyball coach
Luís de Velasco (1511–1564), Spanish nobleman, Viceroy of New Spain
Luis de Velasco, marqués de Salinas (c. 1534–1617), Spanish nobleman, Viceroy of New Spain and of Peru
Luis de Velasco y Velasco, 2nd Count of Salazar (1559–1625), Spanish nobleman, commander in the Eighty Years' War
Luis Vicente de Velasco e Isla (1711–1762), commander in the Royal Spanish Navy
Manuel de Velasco y Tejada, Spanish admiral at the Battle of Vigo Bay (1702)
Manuela Velasco (born 1975), Spanish film actress
Mansueto Velasco (born 1974), Filipino Olympic silver medalist in boxing
María Elena Velasco (born 1940), Mexican actress and film director
Miguel Alemán Velasco (born 1932), Mexican politician, businessman and philanthropist
Pedro Donoso Velasco (1944–2001), Chilean chess master
Presbitero Velasco, Jr. (born 1948), incumbent Associate Justice of the Supreme Court of the Philippines
Roel Velasco (born 1972), retired Filipino boxer
Verónica Ruiz de Velasco (born 1968), Mexican painter
Vicente Manuel de Céspedes y Velasco (died 1794), Spanish governor of Santiago de Cuba and of West Florida
Velasco Sánchez (fl. 1153–1181), Iberian nobleman who held various political and military offices

References

Basque-language surnames